The Women's Long Jump at the 1976 Summer Olympics in Montreal, Quebec had an entry list of 30 competitors, with two qualifying groups before the finals took place on July 23, 1976.

Qualifying
All jumpers 6.30 metres and the top 12 ties advance to the final round. All heights are in metres.

Final standings

References

Women's Long Jump
Long jump at the Olympics
1976 in women's athletics
Women's events at the 1976 Summer Olympics